The FTSE/Athex Large Cap is the stock index of the twenty-five largest companies on the Athens Stock Exchange.

 the stocks comprising this index are:

Viohalco,
Coca-Cola HBC AG,
EYDAP,
Terna Energy,
Lamda Development S.A., 

Hellenic Petroleum,
Gr. Sarantis S.A,  
GEK Terna,
Titan Cement,
ADMIE
 
Public Power Corporation,
Mytilineos Holdings,
OTE, 
OPAP,
Motor Oil Hellas,

Jumbo S.A.,
Piraeus Port Authority (OLP), 
Eurobank Ergasias,
Alpha Bank, 
National Bank of Greece, 

Piraeus Bank,
Folli Follie,  
Hellenic Exchanges Group,
Grivalia Properties R.E.I.C.,
Aegean Airlines.

Former members in recent history include Ellaktor, Metka (Metal Constructions of Greece S.A.), Attica Bank, Fourlis S.A., ATEbank, Bank of Cyprus, Cosmote, Corinth Pipeworks, Emporiki Bank, EYDAP, Frigoglass, Intralot, Marfin Investment Group, Marfin Popular Bank/Cyprus Popular Bank, Greek Postal Savings Bank/TT Hellenic Postbank etc.

The Athens Exchange uses the symbol FTSE for this index.
The Bloomberg code for this index is FTASE ; the ISIN is GRI99201A006 . Financial Times uses the symbol FTS:ATH for this index; Yahoo! Finance uses the symbol FTSE.AT .

History
From 3 December 2012 to 19 June 2017 it consisted of 25 stocks. From 19 June 2017 to 18 December 2018 it consisted of 26 members. Since 18 December 2018, it consists once again of 25 members.

Overview

Notes and references

External links
  All Stock prices and daily price changes on the official website of the Athens Exchange (helex.gr)
   FTSE/Athex Large Cap on Euro2day.gr (in Greek)

European stock market indices
Finance in Greece
FTSE Group stock market indices
Athens Exchange